Adams County is the name of twelve counties in the United States. Most are named for one of two presidents, John Adams or his son, John Quincy Adams:

Adams County, Colorado
Adams County, Idaho 
Adams County, Illinois 
Adams County, Indiana 
Adams County, Iowa 
Adams County, Mississippi 
Adams County, Nebraska 
Adams County, North Dakota 
Adams County, Ohio 
Adams County, Pennsylvania 
Adams County, Washington 
Adams County, Wisconsin